Leona Machálková (born 24 May 1967) is a Czech singer. She had a starring role in the musical Monte Cristo, which premiered in 2000, and became the most expensive Czech musical. She went on to star in the 2003 version of the Czech musical Dracula. The launch of her 2005 album Voda Divoká was attended by former president Václav Havel.

Discography

Studio albums
1998: Film & Muzikál 
1999: Film & Muzikál II
2001: Blízká Setkání
2005: Voda Divoká
2006: Leona

References

External links

1967 births
Living people
People from Zlín
21st-century Czech women singers
20th-century Czech women singers